Nicolas Devilder (born 25 March 1980) is a retired French tennis player. 

Devilder reached a career high ATP singles ranking of World No. 60, achieved on 8 September 2008. He also reached a career high ATP doubles ranking of World No. 197, achieved on 23 March 2009.  

Devilder played primarily in ATP Challenger tournaments, and has won Challenger titles in Pamplona, Monza, Bergamo, Košice, Timișoara and Poznań. He was sponsored by Nike and Babolat. At the 2012 French Open he strung together five consecutive wins all in straight sets, as he needed to come through three qualifying rounds to advance to the main draw, followed by winning his first and second round matches. He was eventually defeated in the third round by World No. 1 and eventual finalist Novak Djokovic 1–6, 2–6, 2–6.

Devilder reached 22 singles finals in his career, with a record of 14 wins and 8 losses which includes a 9–5 record in ATP Challenger finals. Additionally he reached ten career doubles finals in his career with a record of 5 wins and 5 losses which includes a 2–0 record in ATP Challenger finals. His only appearance in an ATP Tour-level final came in doubles at the 2008 Romanian Open on clay courts in Bucharest. In what was an extraordinarily even-leveled back and forth tight match lasting several hours, Devilder and compatriot partner Paul-Henri Mathieu defeated Polish pair Mariusz Fyrstenberg and Marcin Matkowski 7–6(7–4), 6–7(9–11), [22–20] to win the championship.

ATP career finals

Doubles: 1 (1–0)

ATP Challenger and ITF Futures finals

Singles: 22 (14–8)

Doubles: 9 (4–5)

Performance timelines

Singles

Doubles

External links and references
 
 
 Devilder world ranking history

1980 births
Living people
French male tennis players
Sportspeople from Boulogne-Billancourt
People from Dax, Landes
Sportspeople from Landes (department)